The Chappell House, also known as the Howell House in Cedar Creek, South Carolina is a historic farm house built in 1830. The home is an I-house that features a Greek Revival portico and a later addition. 
The original builder and owner is unknown, but it has been in the Chappell family since 1880.  It was listed on the National Register of Historic Places in 1986.

The listing includes five contributing buildings.

References

Houses on the National Register of Historic Places in South Carolina
Houses completed in 1830
Houses in Richland County, South Carolina
National Register of Historic Places in Richland County, South Carolina
1830 establishments in South Carolina